Dry Brook is a stream that flows into the East Branch Delaware River near Arkville, New York.

References

Rivers of New York (state)
Rivers of Delaware County, New York
Rivers of Ulster County, New York
Tributaries of the East Branch Delaware River